Anuv Jain is an Indian singer, songwriter and composer. He is well known for his bass voice and simple chorded songs with lyrics mostly dealing with love and heartbreak. He mostly uses only a guitar or an ukulele, unaccompanied by percussion or other instruments.

Early life and career 
Jain grew up in Ludhiana. When he was 17 years old, his father died after having been in a coma for several years, and Jain began to write songs as a way to express his emotions. He started by uploading original work on his YouTube channel, the first song being "Meri Baaton Mein Tu", after which "Baarishein" followed. In an interview with Rolling Stone India, he said he gets inspiration from real life incidents and writes songs over a period of months. He also cites Joji and Taylor Swift as inspirations.

In 2018, he released his first single "Baarishein". During the COVID-19 pandemic, he decided to pursue music as a full-time career. He has also performed live shows across the country.

Discography

References

Indian singer-songwriters
Musicians from Ludhiana
Living people
Singers from Punjab, India
21st-century Indian singers
Year of birth missing (living people)